This is the results breakdown of the local elections held in Asturias on 28 May 1995. The following tables show detailed results in the autonomous community's most populous municipalities, sorted alphabetically.

Overall

City control
The following table lists party control in the most populous municipalities, including provincial capitals (shown in bold). Gains for a party are displayed with the cell's background shaded in that party's colour.

Municipalities

Avilés
Population: 88,570

Gijón
Population: 269,644

Langreo
Population: 52,023

Mieres
Population: 53,331

Oviedo
Population: 201,712

San Martín del Rey Aurelio
Population: 23,519

Siero
Population: 46,232

See also
1995 Asturian regional election

References

Asturias
1995